Heliopsis filifolia is a rare species of flowering plant in the family Asteraceae. It has been found only in the state of Coahuila in northern Mexico.

References

External links
 Photo of herbarium specimen at Missouri Botanical Garden, collected in Coahuila in 1889, isotype of Heliopsis filifolia

filifolia
Flora of Coahuila
Plants described in 1890